Semiarundinaria is a genus of East Asian bamboo in the grass family.

Semiarundinaria is native to temperate and subtropical woodland in China and Japan. The plants are generally rhizomatous, tall and erect bamboos with cylindrical stems, producing tufts of lanceolate leaves at each node.

Species
 Semiarundinaria densiflora  - Anhui, Guangdong, Hubei, Jiangsu, Jiangxi, Zhejiang
 Semiarundinaria fastuosa - Honshu; cultivated in China
 Semiarundinaria fortis - Kyushu
 Semiarundinaria kagamiana - Honshu
 Semiarundinaria shapoensis - Hainan
 Semiarundinaria sinica - Jiangsu, Zhejiang
 Semiarundinaria yashadake - Japan

Formerly included
see Acidosasa Chimonocalamus Fargesia Oligostachyum × Phyllosasa Sasaella Sinobambusa Yushania

References

Bambusoideae
Bambusoideae genera
Flora of China
Flora of Japan